The 1991 German motorcycle Grand Prix was the sixth round of the 1991 Grand Prix motorcycle racing season. It took place on the weekend of 24–26 May 1991 at the Hockenheim circuit. This was the first motorcycle racing in Germany after the German reunification

500 cc race report
Mick Doohan was on pole, Wayne Rainey was 1 second back in 4th, with Eddie Lawson on the front row again on the ever-improving Cagiva.

Doohan took the lead at the start ahead from Rainey, Eddie Lawson and John Kocinski. Doohan and Rainey developed a small gap to Kevin Schwantz, Lawson and Wayne Gardner. In the stadium section, Rainey tried to go through the inside of Doohan, but going off the racing line proved too slippery and he had to sit-up and got Schwantz on his back wheel.

Rainey recovered his rhythm and passed Doohan, but Schwantz was closing. Kocinski crashed out. Doohan re-took the lead of the trio with Rainey and Schwantz.

Another Rainey/Doohan battle ended inconclusively when Rainey came alongside Doohan and pointed to Doohan’s back tire which was shedding chunks. Going into the stadium section, Schwantz took the lead and Doohan started dropping back.

Last lap: Rainey was in front of Schwantz. Schwantz stayed behind Rainey through the first chicane, trying to build momentum for a draft pass. He managed it and took the lead from Rainey.

It looked like Schwantz has made a tactical error, letting Rainey draft him on the last straight that leads into the stadium section. Rainey draft passed and prepared for the right turn, but Schwantz swung out from behind and performs a spectacular late-braking pass—the RGV was squirming from side-to-side and the back tire was hopping up and down leaving a dashed black line of rubber. Schwantz got it under control and made the turn, but Rainey wasn't giving up and tried to stay on Schwantz’ left as they headed to a left turn, but Schwantz had better drive coming out of the previous turn and got in front of Rainey and stayed there to the line.

After the race Rainey commentated: “... I thought I was pretty lucky that we beat Doohan there when he had a problem. That’s who I was racing for the championship.”

500 cc classification

250 cc classification

125 cc classification

Sidecar classification

References

German motorcycle Grand Prix
German
Motorcycle Grand Prix